Cantalupo Ligure is a comune (municipality) in the Province of Alessandria in the Italian region Piedmont, located about  southeast of Turin and about  southeast of Alessandria.

Cantalupo Ligure borders the following municipalities: Albera Ligure, Borghetto di Borbera, Dernice, Montacuto, Roccaforte Ligure, and Rocchetta Ligure.

References
}

Cities and towns in Piedmont